The 2008 Grand Prix SAR La Princesse Lalla Meryem was a tennis tournament played on outdoor clay courts. It was the 8th edition of the Grand Prix SAR La Princesse Lalla Meryem, and was part of the Tier IV Series of the 2008 WTA Tour. It took place in Fes, Morocco, from 28 April until 4 May 2008.

Singles 
Milagros Sequera was the defending champion, but chose not to participate that year.

Gisela Dulko won in the final 7–6(2), 7–6(5), against Anabel Medina Garrigues.

Seeds

Finals

Top half

Bottom half

Doubles
Vania King and Sania Mirza were the defending champions, but Mirza chose not to participate, and only King competed that year.
King partnered with Lourdes Domínguez Lino, but lost in the first round to Sorana Cîrstea and Anastasia Pavlyuchenkova.

Sorana Cîrstea and Anastasia Pavlyuchenkova won in the final 6–2, 6–2, against Alisa Kleybanova and Ekaterina Makarova.

Seeds

Draw

External links
Official website
Singles, Doubles and Qualifying Singles Draws

Grand Prix SAR La Princesse Lalla Meryem
2008
2008 in Moroccan tennis